Kamphaeng Phet station is a Bangkok MRT station on the Blue Line in Bangkok, Thailand. It is beneath Kamphaeng Phet Road (Thanon), providing a direct access to the Chatuchak Weekend Market and OrTorKor Market.  Not to be confused with the town or province of Kamphaeng Phet.  It has an underground mall that opened in early 2009.

The preceding station is Bang Sue station and next station is Chatuchak Park.

The road is named after Purachatra Jayakara, Prince of Kamphaeng Phet (Thai, พระเจ้าบรมวงศ์เธอ พระองค์เจ้าบุรฉัตรไชยากร กรมพระกำแพงเพชรอัครโยธิน), the first Thai commander of State Railway of Thailand.

References

MRT (Bangkok) stations
Chatuchak district
Railway stations opened in 2004
2004 establishments in Thailand